Too Soon to Love, also known as High School Honeymoon and Teenage Lovers, is a 1960 American exploitation film directed by Richard Rush and starring Richard Evans, Jennifer West and Jack Nicholson.

The film was considered by some critics as among the first of the American "new wave" of filmmaking.

Premise
The film is about the romantic relationship between a woman and a man, barely out of their teens, and another man named Buddy (Nicholson) who tries to steal her away from him.

Cast
 Jennifer West as Cathy Taylor
 Richard Evans as Jim Mills
 Warren Parker as Mr. Taylor
 Ralph Manza as Hughie Wineman
 Jack Nicholson as Buddy
 Billie Bird as Mrs. Jefferson

Production
The film was made for $50,000. It was Francis Ford Coppola's first writing assignment and director Richard Rush said "he had more youth than discipline."

Jack Nicholson was cast off the back of his appearance in The Cry Baby Killer. He would make two more films with Rush.

The film was sold to Universal for $250,000.

References

External links
 
 

1960 films
1960s English-language films
American black-and-white films
Films directed by Richard Rush
1960 romantic drama films
American exploitation films
Teenage pregnancy in film
American romantic drama films
Films scored by Ronald Stein
1960 directorial debut films
1960s American films